The Argyll Arms is a Grade II* listed public house at 18 Argyll Street, Soho, London, W1. It is located close to the site of the former Argyll House, the London residence of the Dukes of Argyll.

It is on the Campaign for Real Ale's National Inventory of Historic Pub Interiors.

It was built in 1868, and altered in about 1895 by Robert Sawyer.

References

Commercial buildings completed in 1868
Grade II* listed pubs in the City of Westminster
National Inventory Pubs